The National Forest is an environmental project in central England run by The National Forest Company. From the 1990s,  of north Leicestershire, south Derbyshire and southeast Staffordshire have been planted in an attempt to blend ancient woodland with newly planted areas to create a new national forest. It stretches from the western outskirts of Leicester in the east to Burton upon Trent in the west, and is planned to link the ancient forests of Needwood and Charnwood.

In January 2018 the UK government unveiled plans to create a new English Northern Forest extending from Liverpool to Hull. It will shadow the path of the east-west M62 motorway.

The National Forest Company

The National Forest Company is a not-for-profit organisation established in April 1995 as a company limited by guarantee. It is supported by the Department for Environment, Food and Rural Affairs (Defra), with the aim of converting one third of the land within the boundaries of the National Forest to woodland, by encouraging landowners to alter their land use. It is described as "a forest in the making" and it is hoped to increase tourism and forestry-related jobs in the area.

Around 8.5 million trees have been planted, more than tripling the woodland cover from 6% to 20%.

Planting
Approximately 85% of the trees planted are native broadleaf species. Some of the most commonly planted species are: English oak, ash, poplar, Corsican pine and Scots pine.

The transformation of the landscape is beginning to take effect as the first tiny whips planted in the early 1990s are growing into substantial trees.

Attractions

At the centre of the National Forest is Conkers, a visitor centre located just outside the village of Moira, Leicestershire.
There is also a visitor centre with wildlife walks and playgrounds at Rosliston.

Other attractions include:

Ashby Canal
Ashby Castle, Ashby-de-la-Zouch
Ashby de-la-Zouch museum, Ashby de-la-Zouch
Battlefield Line Railway
Beacon Hill, Leicestershire
Bradgate Park
Calke Abbey, Ticknall
Claymills Victorian Pumping Station
Croxall Lakes
Donington le Heath Manor House
Flagship Diamond Wood
Foremark Reservoir, Foremark
Fradley Junction
Grace Dieu Priory
Kedleston Hall
Loughborough Outwoods
Melbourne Hall
Moira Furnace
Mount St. Bernard Abbey
National Memorial Arboretum
Rosliston Forestry Centre
Seale Wood
Sence Valley Forest Park
Sharpe's Pottery Museum
Staunton Harold Reservoir
Sudbury Hall
Swithland Wood
The National Forest Maze
T.G.Green Cornishware Archive Museum  
Thornton Reservoir
Tropical Birdland, Leicestershire
Twycross Zoo

The towns of Ashby de la Zouch, Burton upon Trent, Swadlincote and Coalville are located within the forest area.

See also
Reforestation
Plant A Tree In '73
Sherwood Forest

References

External links

 Official site
 Rosliston Forestry Centre
 Conkers Website

Forests and woodlands of Derbyshire
Forests and woodlands of Staffordshire
 
England
Reforestation
North West Leicestershire District
Borough of Charnwood
South Derbyshire District
Borough of East Staffordshire
Lichfield District
Hinckley and Bosworth
Types of formally designated forests
1990 establishments in England
Government agencies established in 1990
Department for Environment, Food and Rural Affairs
Private companies limited by guarantee of the United Kingdom